William Leake Terry (September 27, 1850 – November 4, 1917) was an American attorney and politician who served as a member of the United States House of Representatives for Arkansas's 4th congressional district from 1891 to 1901.

Early life and education
Born near Wadesboro, North Carolina, Terry moved with his parents to Tippah County, Mississippi, in 1857 and to Pulaski County, Arkansas, in 1861. He attended the Bingham Military School and was graduated from Trinity College in June 1872, where he was a member of the Chi Phi Fraternity.

Career 
Terry studied law and was admitted to the Arkansas Bar Association in November 1873. He served as member of the Little Rock City Council from 1877 to 1879 and Arkansas Senate in 1878 and 1879. He also served as the city attorney of Little Rock, Arkansas from 1879 to 1885. He was an unsuccessful candidate for election in 1886 to the Fiftieth Congress.

Terry was elected as a Democrat to the Fifty-second and to the four succeeding congresses (March 4, 1891 – March 3, 1901). During his tenure, Terry was a member of the United States House Committee on the Judiciary. He was an unsuccessful candidate for renomination in 1900. He resumed the practice of law in Little Rock, Arkansas.

Personal life 
Terry was the father of David D. Terry. He died in Little Rock on November 4, 1917 and was interred in Calvary Cemetery.

References

1850 births
1917 deaths
People from Wadesboro, North Carolina
Arkansas city council members
Democratic Party members of the United States House of Representatives from Arkansas
Democratic Party Arkansas state senators
19th-century American politicians